USS LST-965 was an  in the United States Navy. Like many of her class, she was not named and is properly referred to by her hull designation.

Construction
LST-965 was laid down on 27 October 1944, at Hingham, Massachusetts, by the Bethlehem-Hingham Shipyard; launched on 25 November 1944; and commissioned on 20 December 1944.

Service history
Following the war, she performed occupation duty in the Far East and saw service in China until mid-October 1945. She returned to the United States and was decommissioned on 3 June 1946, and struck from the Navy list on 19 July, that same year. On 23 October 1947, the ship was sold to the Boston Metals Corp., Baltimore, Maryland, for scrapping.

Notes

Citations

Bibliography

External links
 

 

LST-542-class tank landing ships
World War II amphibious warfare vessels of the United States
Ships built in Hingham, Massachusetts
1944 ships